Berengaria or Berenguela, the feminine form of the given name Berengar, may refer to:

 Berengaria of Barcelona (1116–1149), queen consort of Castile, León and Galicia
 Berengaria of Navarre (c.1165–1230), queen consort to Richard I of England
 Berengaria of Castile (1180–1246), briefly queen of Castile and León
 Berengaria of Portugal (c. 1195–1221), daughter of King Sancho I of Portugal, queen consort to Valdemar II of Denmark
 Berengaria of León (1204–1237), empress consort of John of Brienne, Latin Emperor of Constantinople

See also 
 Bérengère

Feminine given names

br:Bérengère
fr:Bérengère
it:Berengaria